Matt Bettinelli-Olpin (born February 19, 1978) is an American director, writer, actor, and musician. He is a founding member of the punk band Link 80 and co-creator of the filmmaking collectives Chad, Matt & Rob and Radio Silence. He is best known for his work in horror films, including V/H/S, Southbound, Ready or Not and Scream.

Early life
Raised in Oakland, California, Bettinelli-Olpin attended Chabot Elementary, Claremont Middle School and Bishop O'Dowd High School. He attended college at the University of California, Santa Cruz.

Career

Music
Bettinelli-Olpin formed the Bay Area punk band Link 80 in 1993. On the band's first two albums, 17 Reasons and Killing Katie, Bettinelli-Olpin played guitar, sang backing vocals and co-wrote the lyrics with singer Nick Traina. After leaving Link 80, Bettinelli-Olpin worked as a music journalist and interviewed bands including Alkaline Trio, Dropkick Murphy's, Lawrence Arms, Avail, Blur, Violent Femmes, the Breeders, the Mars Volta and the Psychedelic Furs.

In 2016, Bettinelli-Olpin played guitar in a Link 80 reunion for the Asian Man Records 20th Anniversary. On June 17 and 18, the band played two sold-out shows at the San Francisco's Bottom of the Hill. Before the shows, a video tribute to singer Nick Traina was shown. On May 21, 2021, a Link 80 cover of Rancid's "Junkie Man" was released from Lavasock Records' upcoming 25th anniversary tribute to Rancid's punk rock classic ...And Out Come the Wolves featuring Bettinelli-Olpin on vocals.

Film
In 1999, Bettinelli-Olpin directed Alkaline Trio's first music video (Goodbye Forever) while attending the University of California, Santa Cruz and, in the early 2000s, was roommates with The Lonely Island and appeared in many of their early shorts. While working in the mailroom at New Line Cinema, he formed the filmmaking collective Chad, Matt & Rob in 2007 and Radio Silence in 2011.

Chad, Matt & Rob
Bettinelli-Olpin co-founded Chad, Matt & Rob with Chad Villella and Rob Polonsky in 2007. The group is known for their unique blend of comedy, adventure, sci-fi and horror. According to an interview in IndieWire, Bettinelli-Olpin worked in the mailroom and later as the office manager at New Line Cinema, where the group would sneak in after hours to use the offices as their sets. Among their numerous short films is the viral found footage style video Roommate Alien Prank Gone Bad and five installments of their first-of-its-kind series of Interactive Adventures. Their work online has over 100,000,000 views.

Radio Silence
After the dissolution of Chad, Matt & Rob, Bettinelli-Olpin formed Radio Silence with Tyler Gillett, Justin Martinez and Chad Villella. The group co-directed the 10/31/98 segment of the feature film V/H/S. The film premiered at the 2012 Sundance Film Festival and was released theatrically by Magnolia Pictures in October 2012. The following year, they made Devil's Due for 20th Century Fox and in 2015, their film Southbound premiered at the  Toronto International Film Festival. It was released theatrically by the Orchard on February 5, 2016.

In 2019, Bettinelli-Olpin co-directed the well-reviewed comedic thriller Ready or Not with Tyler Gillett for Fox Searchlight. The film stars Samara Weaving, Adam Brody, Andie MacDowell, and Mark O'Brien.

In March 2020, it was announced that Bettinelli-Olpin would co-direct the fifth installment of the Scream franchise, alongside Tyler Gillett, with Kevin Williamson serving as executive producer. The film was released on January 14, 2022.

In all of his films, Bettinelli-Olpin has used music by Asian Man Records artists including Alkaline Trio, Link 80, MU330, Laura Stevenson and the Cans and The Atom Age.

Discography
 The Link 80 & Wet Nap Split (1995)
 Remember How It Used To Be EP (1995)
 Rumble At The Tracks EP (1996)
 17 Reasons (1996)
 Killing Katie (1997)

Filmography

References

External links

Radio Silence
Chad, Matt & Rob
Link 80

1978 births
Living people
Film directors from California
American punk rock guitarists
Horror film directors
American male writers
American male film actors
Male actors from Oakland, California
Writers from Oakland, California
University of California, Santa Cruz alumni
American male comedians
Comedians from California
American people of Italian descent